Terry Meek (born November 3, 1962, in Regina, Saskatchewan) is a Canadian curler from Calgary, Alberta. He is a former world silver medalist and is the current coaching consultant of the Cheryl Bernard rink (and is also her common law partner). He also skips his own team on the World Curling Tour.

Career
Meek played in his first provincial championship in 1987. In 1993, he skipped his mixed team to a provincial championship, and lost the final of the 1993 Canadian Mixed Curling Championship. Since then, Meek has played in 5 more (1994, 1999, 2003, 2008, 2011) provincial men's championships, but has yet to win the event.  In 2009, he was invited to be the alternate on the Kevin Martin team, which won the 2009 Tim Hortons Brier and won a silver medal at the 2009 World Men's Curling Championship. Meek played in two games at the 2009 Worlds.

Personal life
Outside of curling, Meek was the founder of Thunder Energy, Ember Resources, Point Loma Resources, which were public listed oil, gas exploration and production company. Also President and CEO of multiple Private energy companies. He has two sons, Evan Pawlak and Connor Meek.

References

External links
 Team Bernard profile
 

1962 births
Canadian engineers
Living people
Curlers from Calgary
Curlers from Regina, Saskatchewan
Canadian male curlers